Robert Theodore Ammon (August 30, 1949 – October 20, 2001) was an American financier and investment banker. Born in Pittsburgh, Pennsylvania, he was murdered in his home in 2001 by electrician Daniel Pelosi, who was convicted in 2004. Ammon and his wife, Generosa Ammon, were in the midst of a divorce at the time of his death, and Daniel Pelosi was later romantically linked to Ammon's soon-to-be ex-wife. Ammon and his wife had originally married on February 2, 1986, and had two children, the twins Greg Ammon and Alexa Ammon, whom they adopted from the village of Medvedivtsi in the Mukachevo Region of Ukraine, in October 1992.

At the time of the murder, the couple were near finalization of their divorce. The custody agreement had been signed on October 18, 2001, and the divorce settlement was expected to be consented to the following week. Four months after Ted's death, Generosa married Daniel Pelosi on January 15, 2002; she died of cancer on August 22, 2003.

Early life

Ted Ammon was born to Robert E Ammon, a pension coordinator from Shenango Furnace Co., Neville Island and Betty Lee Morris, a homemaker, on August 30, 1949, in Pittsburgh, Pennsylvania. Ted graduated from Bucknell University. He entered the Bank of America's executive-training program following his graduation from Bucknell. His first wife, Randee Day, was also a member of the program. They married in 1973 and moved to England. Ted passed the New York bar the first time, without taking a law-school class.

Career

After the Ammons moved back to the United States, he secured a position with Lord, Day and Lord.  He subsequently went to work at the law firm of Mayer, Brown and Platt. One of this firm's clients was the then small investment firm of Kohlberg, Kravis, Roberts & Co. (KKR). In 1983, following his legal work on a KKR deal (and his divorce from his first wife), Ammon was recruited by the private equity firm, which specialized in leveraged buyouts. Ammon served as an associate at Kohlberg, Kravis, Roberts & Co. from 1984 to 1989 and as a general partner from 1990 to 1992. He worked on many deals, notably the famous $31 billion RJ Reynolds/Nabisco takeover. He joined his colleagues in becoming a multimillionaire and was quoted numerous times in the book Barbarians at the Gate: The Fall of RJR Nabisco.  According to Russ Baker in the May 2002 issue of Gotham, "He was along for the wild ride as KKR grew into one of Wall Street's most aggressive and storied leveraged buyout outfits."

In 1992, Ammon left KKR in order to establish his own company, Big Flower Press. The firm became a leader in the printing of advertising inserts for newspapers. Ammon's goal was to create relationships with newspapers nationwide and then to provide them with other needed commodities. Big Flower was later renamed Vertis Holdings, Inc. Through more than thirty acquisitions, the firm diversified geographically and became a leading international supplier of integrated marketing services, including high-value printing, advertising, and imaging technology.

Vertis went public in 1995; in 1999, it was acquired by a group of investors, including Ammon, in a private leveraged recapitalization. Ammon served as chief executive officer from the company's inception until April 1997 and as chairman of the board from the company's formation through December 2000. With Vertis facing dramatically changing market conditions (e.g., a high debt multiple and a slowing pace of acquisitions), a mutually advantageous separation/payout agreement was worked out between Vertis and Ammon. During his time at Vertis, Ammon had put together a "deal team" and venture capital program, managing an in-house venture business. He also had set up several holding companies, which held the vast share of his ownership interests.

These ventures directly invested in both public and non-public companies and in such general areas as technology, media, marketing and management services, and the internet. The specific fields of these companies included print and digital technology, diagnostic radiology, long-distance telephone service, and biopharmaceutical innovation.

After leaving Vertis, Ammon oversaw his team's venture capital investments through the entities that he had established. Much of the money that Vertis had paid to Ammon provided seed money for his investments. Two of the most profitable investments were in Moore Corporation Limited, a Vertis competitor, and National Imaging Associates, Inc., a provider of health care services.

Divorce and murder

Ammon's marriage turned hostile after Generosa found a receipt for a divorce lawyer in his desk. They were days from finalizing their divorce when, on October 22, 2001, he was found bludgeoned to death in his East Hampton, NY weekend home. Because their divorce was not finalized and Ammon's will had not been changed, Generosa inherited 50 per cent of his estate, in accordance with the will, with the balance going to the Ammon Foundation.  On January 15, 2002, Generosa married Daniel Pelosi, then sold the properties she had owned jointly with Ammon.

JPMorgan Chase & Co. was appointed along with Generosa as co-executors of the estate. Ultimately, Generosa's estate inherited Ammon's estate. The estate did not pass until after her death.

Pelosi was convicted of Ammon's murder in December 2004 and was sentenced to 25 years to life in prison; he continues to maintain his innocence.

Charity

With a total net worth of some $100 million, Ammon created the largest scholarship fund at Bucknell. Subsequently, he complemented this endowed program with a challenge/matching grant, resulting in added incentives for others to contribute to his alma mater. He served on the boards of the Municipal Art Society, and the YMCA. He attained to the title of chairman at Jazz at Lincoln Center, where he worked closely with Wynton Marsalis.

On October 22, 2012, Greg and Alexa Ammon donated a $1 million gift from the Ammon Foundation to Jazz at Lincoln Center to name the R. Theodore Ammon Archives and Music Library. "Ted considered the archive and music library essential to the integrity of this institution. The Ammon Archives and Music Library will be accessible to students and lovers of jazz the world over," said Wynton Marsalis, managing and artistic director of Jazz at Lincoln Center. "My father's deep commitment to Jazz at Lincoln Center inspired my sister Alexa and I to continue his legacy with this naming gift for the preservation and perpetuation of the music he loved so much. Wynton's vision for The Ammon Archive and Music Library aligns with my father's commitment to enrich people's lives around the world with jazz," said Greg Ammon.

On November 15, 2012, Jazz at Lincoln Center hosted a private ribbon cutting for The Ammon Archives and Music Library followed by the New York City film premiere of Greg Ammon's documentary, 59 Middle Lane later that evening.  Proceeds from the premiere event benefited Jazz at Lincoln Center and the Evan B. Donaldson Adoption Institute.

Funeral

Thousands of people attended a Manhattan memorial service for Ammon in Alice Tully Hall, the home of Jazz at Lincoln Center. Among the Wall Street dignitaries in attendance were Henry Kravis, head of Kohlberg, Kravis, Roberts & Co, Apollo Capital chief Leon Black, and Roger Altman, Deputy Treasury Secretary under U.S. President Bill Clinton. Ammon's two children sat with the family but without their mother since, at the request of Ammon's sister Sandra, Generosa did not attend.

At the service, Wynton Marsalis honored Ammon with a New-Orleans-style jazz send-off. Before playing the funeral march, Marsalis spoke to the congregation. "We want to know the particulars of death — it repulses us, it calls us, it fascinates us ... but only the dead know the facts of death, and they never tell."

Generosa died of breast cancer in August 2003. She left the majority of her estate to the twins, and legal guardianship of them to their nanny, Kaye Mayne. Full custody of the twins was eventually awarded to Ammon's sister; they spent the remainder of their childhood with her in Huntsville, Alabama.

David Sutcliffe played Ammon in the TV movie Murder in the Hamptons (also known as "Million Dollar Murder").

Grandmother

His maternal grandmother was Neva Morris of Ames, Iowa, (August 3, 1895 – April 6, 2010), who at age 114 was the oldest person in the United States when she died.

References

External links 
 http://www.people.com/people/archive/article/0,,20135757,00.html – People Magazine
 Murder in East Hampton Vanity Fair January 2002
 Mystery of the Murdered Millionaire Dateline NBC
 The War for Ted Ammon's Children New York Magazine 7 July 2003
 http://www.russbaker.com/archives/Gotham%20Magazine%20-%20article.htm
 https://www.cbsnews.com/news/part-iii-murder-in-the-hamptons/
 http://www.cnn.com/2005/LAW/01/26/pelosi/index.html
 https://web.archive.org/web/20080202144005/http://wcbstv.com/topstories/danny.pelosi.ted.2.643060.html
 https://www.amazon.com/Almost-Paradise-Hampton-Murder-Ammon/dp/0312340230
 http://realestalker.blogspot.com/2007/12/ammon-house-in-east-hampton.html
 https://nymag.com/nymetro/news/columns/courtside/10363/ – New York Magazine
 http://www.businessweek.com/magazine/content/03_42/b3854107_mz020.htm
 https://web.archive.org/web/20051219161332/http://www.kierancrowley.com/NewsDetail.asp?id=10
 http://www.timesonline.co.uk/tol/news/uk/article1138901.ece

1949 births
2001 deaths
Bucknell University alumni
Deaths by beating in the United States
Businesspeople from Pittsburgh
20th-century American lawyers
Private equity and venture capital investors
American murder victims
People murdered in New York (state)
Male murder victims
Lawyers from Pittsburgh
20th-century American businesspeople
2001 murders in the United States